Kennedy Creek may refer to:

Kennedy Creek (Pennsylvania), a tributary of South Branch Tunkhannock Creek
Kennedy Creek (Totten Inlet tributary), a stream in Washington state